This is a list of 167 species in the genus Canthon, tumblebugs.

Canthon species

 Canthon aberrans (Harold, 1868) c g
 Canthon acutiformis Balthasar, 1939 c g
 Canthon acutoides Schmidt, 1922 c g
 Canthon acutus Harold, 1868 c g
 Canthon aequinoctialis Harold, 1868 c g
 Canthon angularis Harold, 1868 c g
 Canthon angustatus Harold, 1867 c g
 Canthon antoniomartinezi Rivera-Cervantes & Halffter, 1999 c g
 Canthon ateuchiceps Bates, 1887 c g
 Canthon auricollis Redtenbacher, 1867 c g
 Canthon balteatus Boheman, 1858 c g
 Canthon bicolor Castelnau, 1840 c g
 Canthon bimaculatus Schmidt, 1922 c g
 Canthon bisignatus Balthasar, 1939 i c g
 Canthon bispinus (Germar, 1824) c g
 Canthon brunneus Schmidt, 1922 c g
 Canthon brunnipennis Schmidt, 1922 c g
 Canthon caelius Bates, 1887 c g
 Canthon callosus Harold, 1868 c g
 Canthon candens (Gistel, 1857) c g
 Canthon carbonarius Harold, 1868 c g
 Canthon chalcites (Haldeman, 1843) i c g b
 Canthon championi Bates, 1887 c g
 Canthon chiriguano Martinez & Halffter, 1972 c g
 Canthon cinctellus (Germar, 1824) c g
 Canthon circulatus Harold, 1868 c g
 Canthon coahuilensis Howden, 1966 i c g
 Canthon cobosi Pereira & Martinez, 1960 c g
 Canthon coeruleicollis Blanchard, 1846 c g
 Canthon coerulescens Schmidt, 1922 c g
 Canthon coloratus Schmidt, 1922 c g
 Canthon columbianus Schmidt, 1920 c g
 Canthon corporaali Balthasar, 1939 c g
 Canthon corruscus Castelnau, 1840 c g
 Canthon curvipes Harold, 1868 c g
 Canthon curvodilatatus Schmidt, 1920 c g
 Canthon cyanellus Leconte, 1859 i c g b
 Canthon daguerrei Martinez, 1951 c g
 Canthon delgadoi Rivera-Cervantes & Halffter, 1999 c g
 Canthon delicatulus Balthasar, 1939 c g
 Canthon deloyai Rivera-Cervantes & Halffter, 1999 c g
 Canthon delpontei Martinez & Halffter, 1972 c g
 Canthon denticulatus Schmidt, 1922 c g
 Canthon dentiger Harold, 1868 c g
 Canthon deplanatus Harold, 1868 c g
 Canthon depressipennis Leconte, 1859 i c g b
 Canthon deyrollei Harold, 1868 c g
 Canthon dives Harold, 1868 c g
 Canthon divinator (Gistel, 1857) c g
 Canthon doesburgi Huijbregts, 2010 g
 Canthon ebeneus (Say, 1823) c g
 Canthon ebenus (Say, 1823) i g b
 Canthon edentulus Harold, 1868 c g
 Canthon edmondsi Rivera-Cervantes & Halffter, 1999 c g
 Canthon enkerlini (Martinez, Halffter & Halffter, 1964) c g
 Canthon euryscelis Bates, 1887 c g
 Canthon fallax Harold, 1868 c g
 Canthon femoralis (Chevrolat, 1834) i c g
 Canthon forcipatus Harold, 1868 c g
 Canthon formosus Harold, 1868 c g
 Canthon forreri Bates, 1887 i c g
 Canthon fulgidus Redtenbacher, 1867 c g
 Canthon fuscipes Erichson, 1847 c g
 Canthon gemellatus Erichson, 1847 c g
 Canthon hartmanni Howden & Gill, 1987 c g
 Canthon helleri Schmidt, 1922 c g
 Canthon heyrovskyi Balthasar, 1939 c g
 Canthon histrio Lepeletier de Saint Fargeau & Audinet-Serville, 1828 g
 Canthon honsi Balthasar, 1939 c g
 Canthon humboldti Solis & Kohlmann, 2002 c g
 Canthon humectus (Say, 1832) i c g b
 Canthon ibarragrassoi (Martinez, 1952) c g
 Canthon imitator Brown, 1946 i c g b
 Canthon indigaceus LECONTE, 1866 i c g b
 Canthon integricollis Schaeffer, 1915 c g
 Canthon inusitatus Kohlmann & Solis, 2006 c g
 Canthon janthinus Blanchard, 1846 c g
 Canthon juvencus Harold, 1868 c g
 Canthon lafargei (Drapiez, 1820) c g
 Canthon laminatus Balthasar, 1939 c g
 Canthon lamprimus Bates, 1887 c g
 Canthon lamproderes Redtenbacher, 1867 c g
 Canthon latipes Blanchard, 1843 c g
 Canthon lecontei Harold, 1868 i c g b
 Canthon leechi Martinez, Halffter & Halffter, 1964 c g
 Canthon lituratus (Germar, 1813) c g
 Canthon lividus Blanchard, 1846 c g
 Canthon lucreciae Halffter & Halffter, 2009 g
 Canthon lunatus Schmidt, 1922 c g
 Canthon luteicollis Erichson, 1847 c g
 Canthon maldonadoi Martinez, 1951 c g
 Canthon manantlanensis Rivera-Cervantes & Halffter, 1999 c g
 Canthon marmoratus Pereira & Martinez, 1956 c g
 Canthon matthewsi Martinez & Halffter, 1972 c g
 Canthon melancholicus Harold, 1868 c g
 Canthon melanus Robinson, 1948 i c g b
 Canthon meridionalis Martinez, Halffter & Halffter, 1964 c g
 Canthon mixtus Robinson, 1948 i c g
 Canthon modestus Harold, 1867 c g
 Canthon monilifer Blanchard, 1846 c g
 Canthon montanus Rivera-Cervantes & Halffter, 1999 c g
 Canthon moroni Rivera-Cervantes & Halffter, 1999 c g
 Canthon morsei Howden, 1966 c g
 Canthon mutabilis Lucas, 1857 c g
 Canthon muticus Harold, 1867 c g
 Canthon nigripennis Lansberge, 1874 c g
 Canthon nyctelius Bates, 1887 c g
 Canthon obliquus Horn, 1894 i c g
 Canthon obscuriellus Schmidt, 1922 c g
 Canthon octodentatus Schmidt, 1920 c g
 Canthon oliverioi Pereira & Martinez, 1956 c g
 Canthon orfilai Martinez, 1949 c g
 Canthon ornatus Redtenbacher, 1867 c g
 Canthon pacificus Rivera-Cervantes & Halffter, 1999 c g
 Canthon pallidus Schmidt, 1922 c g
 Canthon pauxillus Harold, 1883 c g
 Canthon perplexus Le Conte, 1847 g
 Canthon perseverans Matthews, 1966 c g
 Canthon pilularius (Linnaeus, 1758) i c g b  (common tumblebug)
 Canthon piluliformis Blanchard, 1846 c g
 Canthon plagiatus Harold, 1880 c g
 Canthon planus Lucas, 1857 c g
 Canthon podagricus Harold, 1868 c g
 Canthon politus Harold, 1868 c g
 Canthon praticola Leconte, 1859 i c g b
 Canthon principalis (Burmeister, 1873) c g
 Canthon probus (Germar, 1824) i c g
 Canthon punctatus Schmidt, 1922 c g
 Canthon puncticollis LeConte, 1866 i c g
 Canthon quadratus Blanchard, 1846 c g
 Canthon quadriguttatus (Olivier, 1789) c g
 Canthon quadripunctatus Redtenbacher, 1867 c g
 Canthon quinquemaculatus Castelnau, 1840 c g
 Canthon reichei Felsche, 1910 c g
 Canthon reyesi (Martinez & Halffter, 1972) c g
 Canthon rubrescens Blanchard, 1846 c g
 Canthon rutilans Castelnau, 1840 c g
 Canthon rzedowskii Rivera-Cervantes & Halffter, 1999 c g
 Canthon semiopacus Harold, 1868 c g
 Canthon septemmaculatus (Latreille, 1812) c g
 Canthon sericatus Schmidt, 1922 c g
 Canthon signifer Harold, 1868 c g
 Canthon silvaticus Solis & Kohlmann, 2002 c g
 Canthon simplex Leconte, 1857 i c g b
 Canthon simulans Martinez, 1950 c g
 Canthon smaragdulus (Fabricius, 1781) c g
 Canthon sordidus Harold, 1868 c g
 Canthon splendidus Schmidt, 1922 c g
 Canthon staigi Pereira, 1953 c g
 Canthon steinheili Harold, 1880 c g
 Canthon subcyaneus Erichson, 1848 c g
 Canthon subhyalinus Harold, 1867 c g
 Canthon substriatus Harold, 1868 c g
 Canthon sulcatus Castelnau, 1840 c g
 Canthon tetraodon Blanchard, 1846 c g
 Canthon triangularis (Drury, 1770) c g
 Canthon unicolor Blanchard, 1846 c g
 Canthon variabilis Martinez, 1948 c g
 Canthon vazquezae Martinez, Halffter & Halffter, 1964 c g
 Canthon velutinus Harold, 1868 c g
 Canthon viduus Harold, 1868 c g
 Canthon vigilans Leconte, 1858 i c g b  (vigilant dung beetle)
 Canthon violaceus (Olivier, 1789) c g
 Canthon virens (Mannerheim, 1829) c g
 Canthon viridis (Palisot de Beauvois, 1805) i c g b
 Canthon vulcanoae Pereira & Martinez, 1956 c g
 Canthon zuninoi Rivera-Cervantes & Halffter, 1999 c g

Data sources: i = ITIS, c = Catalogue of Life, g = GBIF, b = Bugguide.net

References

Canthon